Grand View (also Grandview, Pratt) is an unincorporated, census-designated place located in the town of Grandview, Bayfield County, Wisconsin, United States.

U.S. Highway 63 serves as a main route in the community. Grand View is located 23 miles southwest of the city of Ashland; and 34 miles northeast of the city of Hayward.

Grand View has a post office with ZIP code 54839. As of the 2010 census, its population is 163.

History
A post office was established as Grandview in 1900; the spelling was changed to Grand View in 1970. The community was named from the scenery.

Notable people
Vic C. Wallin, Wisconsin State Representative and businessman, lived in Grand View.

References

Census-designated places in Bayfield County, Wisconsin
Census-designated places in Wisconsin